Bannang Sata is the principal town of the Bannang Sata district in the Yala Province of Thailand. A subdistrict municipality (thesaban tambon), it covers parts of the subdistrict (tambon) of Bannang Sata. In 2007 it had a population of 2,856.

The municipality was created as a sanitary district (sukhaphiban) in 1956. Like all sanitary districts, it was upgraded to a subdistrict municipality in 1999.

References

Populated places in Yala province